"Because I could not stop for Death" is a lyrical poem by Emily Dickinson first published posthumously in Poems: Series 1 in 1890. Dickinson's work was never authorized to be published, so it is unknown whether "Because I could not stop for Death" was completed or "abandoned".  The speaker of Dickinson's poem meets personified Death. Death is a gentleman who is riding in the horse carriage that picks up the speaker in the poem and takes the speaker on her journey to the afterlife. According to Thomas H. Johnson's variorum edition of 1955 the number of this poem is "712".

The poet's persona speaks about Death and Afterlife, the peace that comes along with it without haste. She personifies Death as a young man riding along with her in a carriage. As she goes through to the afterlife she briefs us of her past life while she was still alive.

Summary 

The poem was published posthumously in 1890 in Poems: Series 1, a collection of Dickinson's poems assembled and edited by her friends Mabel Loomis Todd and Thomas Wentworth Higginson. The poem was published under the title "The Chariot". It is composed in six quatrains in common metre. Stanzas 1, 2, 4, and 6 employ end rhyme in their second and fourth lines, but some of these are only close rhyme or eye rhyme. In the third stanza, there is no end rhyme, but "ring" in line 2 rhymes with "gazing" and "setting" in lines 3 and 4 respectively. Internal rhyme is scattered throughout. Figures of speech include alliteration, anaphora, paradox, and personification.

The poem personifies Death as a gentleman caller who takes a leisurely carriage ride with the poet to her grave. She also personifies immortality.

A Volta, or turn, occurs in the fourth stanza. Structurally, the syllables shift from its regular 8-6-8-6 scheme to 6-8-8-6. This parallels with the undertones of the sixth quatrain. The personification of death changes from one of pleasantry to one of ambiguity and morbidity: "Or rather--He passed Us-- / The Dews drew quivering and chill--" (13–14). The imagery changes from its original nostalgic form of children playing and setting suns to Death's real concern of taking the speaker to the afterlife.

Text 

{|
! scope="col" width="300px" | Close transcription
! scope="col" width="300px" | First published version
|-
|
Because I could not stop for Death —
He kindly stopped for me —
The Carriage held but just Ourselves —
And Immortality.

We slowly drove — He knew no haste
And I had put away
My labor and my leisure too,
For His Civility —

We passed the School, where Children strove
At Recess — in the Ring —
We passed the Fields of Gazing Grain —
We passed the Setting Sun —

Or rather — He passed Us —
The Dews drew quivering and Chill —
For only Gossamer, my Gown —
My Tippet — only Tulle —

We paused before a House that seemed
A Swelling of the Ground —
The Roof was scarcely visible —
The Cornice — in the Ground —

Since then — 'tis Centuries — and yet
Feels shorter than the Day
I first surmised the Horses' Heads
Were toward Eternity —
|
THE CHARIOT

Because I could not stop for Death,
He kindly stopped for me;
The carriage held but just ourselves
And Immortality.

We slowly drove, he knew no haste,
And I had put away
My labor, and my leisure too,
For his civility.

We passed the school where children played,
Their lessons scarcely done;
We passed the fields of gazing grain,
We passed the setting sun.

We paused before a house that seemed
A swelling of the ground;
The roof was scarcely visible,
The cornice but a mound.

Since then 'tis centuries; but each
Feels shorter than the day
I first surmised the horses' heads
Were toward eternity.
|}

Critique and interpretation 

There are various interpretations of Dickinson's poem surrounding the Christian belief in the afterlife and read the poem as if it were from the perspective of a "delayed final reconciliation of the soul with God." Dickinson has been classified by critics before as a Christian poet as her other works have been interpreted as contemplation of the "merits of Christ and his past, present, and future relation to herself."

The speaker joins both "Death" and "Immortality" inside the carriage that collects her, thus personifying the two part process, according to the Christian faith, that first life stops and following death we encounter immortality through our existence in the after life. While death is the guaranteed of the two, immortality "remains ... an expectation." The horses that lead the carriage are only facing "toward Eternity," which indicates either that the speaker has yet to reach it or that it can never be reached at all.

Dickinson's tone contributes to the poem as well. In describing a traditionally frightening experience, the process of dying and passing into eternity, she uses a passive and calm tone. Critics attribute the lack of fear in her tone as 
her acceptance of death as "a natural part of the endless cycle of nature," due to the certainty in her belief in Christ.

In 1936 Allen Tate wrote,

Musical settings 

The poem has been set to music by Aaron Copland as the twelfth song of his song cycle Twelve Poems of Emily Dickinson. And again, by John Adams as the second movement of his choral symphony Harmonium, and also set to music by Nicholas J. White as a single movement piece for chorus and chamber orchestra. Natalie Merchant and Susan McKeown have created a song of the same name while preserving Dickinson's exact poem in its lyrics.

References

External links 

 Critical essays on "Because I could not stop for Death"
 The poem, set to music

American poems
Poetry by Emily Dickinson
Poems about death
1890 poems
Poems published posthumously